The stilb (sb) is the CGS unit of luminance for objects that are not self-luminous. It is equal to one candela per square centimeter or 104 nits (candelas per square meter). The name was coined by the French physicist André Blondel around 1920. It comes from the Greek word , meaning 'to glitter'.

It was in common use in Europe up to World War I. In North America self-explanatory terms such as candle per square inch and candle per square meter were more common. The unit has since largely been replaced by the SI unit: candela per square meter. The current national standard for SI in the United States discourages the use of the stilb.

Unit conversion

See also
 Scotopic stilb

References

Further reading
 Stilb  at A Dictionary of Units of Measurement, Russ Rowlett and the University of North Carolina at Chapel Hill. Accessed June 2008.
 Stilb at Sizes.com. Accessed June 2008.

Units of luminance
Centimetre–gram–second system of units